David Ross (born 19 January 1945) is an English actor who has worked in theatre, cinema and television. His best-known roles include playing the first Kryten and the second Talkie Toaster in science-fiction comedy Red Dwarf, Elgin Sparrowhawk in the BBC One sitcom The Green Green Grass, and as Mr. Sedley in a 1998 serial adaptation of William Makepeace Thackeray's novel Vanity Fair.

Ross also played Inspector Martin in The Adventures of Sherlock Holmes, Mr. Sherwin in Basil, a cheating betting shop owner in the BBC One comedy Goodnight Sweetheart, Basil Tyler (a kind-natured, well meaning cab driver and postman who was unlucky in love) in John Sullivan's BBC comedy drama Roger Roger, and Donald Moss (a DHSS officer) in Alan Bleasdale's Boys from the Blackstuff. On BBC Radio 2 in 1985, Ross starred alongside Jack Smethurst in the second series of A Proper Charlie (a comedy by Vince Powell, in which Madge Hindle also featured).. In 1989, he appeared as a Registrar in an episode of the comedy Watching.

In 1991, Ross appeared in a second major Bleasdale drama series, G.B.H.. He has also appeared in Doc Martin and in the final episode of the long-running comedy series Last of the Summer Wine (2010).

Ross starred in Bleasdale's stage play Having a Ball, set in a vasectomy clinic. It was a success in the UK but a box-office disaster in Australia where it was presented by John McCallum. The play co-starred Jacki Weaver and Maggie Dence.

In 2016, Ross appeared in the crime thriller Monochrome. In 2017, he reprised his role of Talkie Toaster in the Red Dwarf XII episode "Mechocracy".

References

External links
 
A summary of David Ross's career by The New York Times.
Blog entry that has links about the play And Then There Were None, which was at the Gielgud in late 2005/early 2006. David played Albert Blore

1945 births
Living people
English male film actors
English male stage actors
English male television actors
People from Blackburn
Male actors from Lancashire